Serra Riccò is a comune (municipality) in the Metropolitan City of Genoa in the Italian region Liguria, located about  north of Genoa, in the Val Polcevera.

Serra Riccò borders the following municipalities: Casella, Genoa, Mignanego, Montoggio, Sant'Olcese, Savignone. It is composed by a series of villages, the municipal seat being located in Pedemonte.

References

External links
 Official website

Cities and towns in Liguria